Asystasia glandulifera is a species of plant in the family Acanthaceae. It is endemic to Cameroon.  Its natural habitat is subtropical or tropical moist lowland forests.

References

Flora of Cameroon
glandulifera
Vulnerable plants
Taxonomy articles created by Polbot